The Kingdom of Kapisa (known in contemporary Chinese sources as  and ) was a state located in what is now Afghanistan during the late 1st millennium CE. Its capital was the  city of Kapisa. The kingdom stretched from the Hindu Kush in the north to Bamiyan and Kandahar in the south and west, out as far as  the modern Jalalabad District in the east.

The name Kapisa appears to be a Sanskritized form of an older name for the area, from prehistory. Following its conquest in 329 BCE by Alexander the Great, the area was known in the Hellenic world as Alexandria on the Caucasus, although the older name appears to have survived.

In around 600 CE, the Chinese Buddhist monk Xuanzang made a pilgrimage to Kapisa, and described there the cultivation of rice and wheat, and a king of the Suli tribe.  In his chronicle, he relates that in Kapisa were over 6,000 monks of the Mahayana school of Buddhism. In a 7th-century Chinese chronicle, the Book of Sui, Kapisa appears to be known as the kingdom of Cao. In other Chinese works, it is called Jibin ( Jibin).

Between the 7th and 9th centuries, the kingdom was ruled by the Turk Shahi dynasty. At one point, Bagram was the capital of the kingdom, though in the 7th century, the center of power of Kapisa shifted to Kabul.

Kapisi

Kapisi or Kapisa was the capital city of the Kingdom of Kapisa. While the name of the kingdom has been used for the modern Kapisa Province in Afghanistan, the ancient city of Kapisa  was located in Parwan Province, in or near present-day Bagram.

The first references to Kapisa appear in the writings of 5th-century BCE Indian scholar Achariya Pāṇini. Pāṇini refers to the city of Kapiśi, a city of the Kapisa kingdom. Pāṇini also refers to Kapiśayana, a famous wine from Kapisa. The city of Kapiśi also appeared as Kaviśiye on Indo-Greek coins of Apollodotus/Eucratides, as well as the Nezak Huns.

Archeology discoveries in 1939 confirmed that the city of Kapisa was an emporium for Kapiśayana wine, discovering numerous glass flasks, fish-shaped wine jars, and drinking cups typical of the wine trade of the era. The grapes (Kapiśayani Draksha) and wine (Kapiśayani Madhu) of the area are referred to by several works of ancient Indian literature. The Mahabharata also noted the common practice of slavery in the city.  The Begram ivories, inlays surviving from burnt furniture, were important artistic finds.

In later times, Kapisa seems to have been part of a kingdom ruled by a Buddhist Kshatriya king holding sway over ten neighboring states including Lampaka, Nagarahara, Gandhara and Banu, according to the Chinese pilgrim Xuan Zang who visited in 644 AD. Xuan Zang notes the Shen breed of horses from the area, and also notes the production of many types of cereals and fruits, as well as a scented root called Yu-kin.

Etymology

Equivalence to Sanskrit Kamboja

Scholar community holds that Kapisa is equivalent to Sanskrit Kamboja.  In other words, Kamboja and Kapisa are believed to be two attempts to render the same foreign word (which could not appropriately be transliterated into Sanskrit). Historian S. Levi further holds that old Persian Ka(m)bujiya or Kau(n)bojiya, Sanskrit Kamboja as well as Kapisa, all etymologically refer to the same foreign word.

Even the evidence from the 3rd-century Buddhist tantra text Mahamayuri (which uses Kabusha for Kapisha) and the Ramayana-manjri by Sanskrit Acharya, Kshemendra of Kashmir (11th century AD), which specifically equates Kapisa with Kamboja, thus substituting the former with the latter, therefore, sufficiently attest that Kapisa and Kamboja are equivalent. Even according to illustrious Indian history series: History and Culture of Indian People, Kapisa and Kamboja are equivalent. Scholars like Dr Moti Chandra, Dr Krishna Chandra Mishra etc. also write that the Karpasika (of Mahabharata) and Kapisa (Ki-pin/Ka-pin/Chi-pin of the Chinese writings)  are synonymous terms.

Thus, both Karpasika and Kapisa are essentially equivalent to Sanskrit Kamboja. And Pāṇinian term Kapiśi is believed to have been the capital of ancient Kamboja. Kapisa (Ki-pin, Ke-pin, Ka-pin, Chi-pin of the Chinese records), in fact, refers to the Kamboja kingdom, located on the south-eastern side of the Hindukush in the Paropamisadae region. It was anciently inhabited by the Aśvakayana (Greek: Assakenoi), and the Aśvayana (Greek Aspasio) (q.v.) sub-tribes of the Kambojas. Epic Mahabharata refers to two Kamboja settlements: one called Kamboja, adjacent to the Daradas (of Gilgit), extending from Kafiristan to south-east Kashmir including Rajauri/Poonch districts, while the original Kamboja, known as Parama Kamboja was located north of Hindukush in Transoxiana territory mainly in Badakshan and Pamirs/Allai valley, as neighbors to the Rishikas in the Scythian land. Even the Komoi clan of Ptolemy, inhabiting towards Sogdiana mountainous regions, north of Bactria, is believed by scholars to represent the Kamboja people.

With passage of time, the Paropamisan settlements came to be addressed as Kamboja proper, whereas the original Kamboja settlement lying north of Hindukush, in Transoxiana, became known as 'Parama-Kamboja' i.e. furthest Kamboja. Some scholars call Parama Kamboja as 'Uttara-Kamboja' i.e. northern Kamboja or Distant Kamboja. The Kapisa-Kamboja equivalence also applies to the Paropamisan Kamboja settlement.

Physical characteristics of the people of Kapiśa

Hiuen Tsang says that "the people of Kapiśa (Kai-pi-chi(h)) are cruel and fierce; their language is coarse and rude. Their marriage ceremonies are mere intermingling of sexes.The Vahikas or Arattas were divided into many tribes or clans like the Gandharas, Prasthalas, Khasas, Vasatis, Trigartas, Pauravas, Malavas, Yaudheyas, Saindhavas, Sauviras; the Iranian and transfrontier peoples such as the Kambojas, Pahlavas; and the Persianised Ionians (Yavanas) as well as the nomadic Scythians, also called Shakas (See: Evolution of Heroic Tradition in Ancient Panjab, 1971, p 53, Dr Buddha Parkash; Cf also: The History of Indian Literature, 1878, p 178, Albrecht Weber - Sanskrit literature).Cf: D. D. Kosambi observes: "The caste observances were so slack in the frontiers that the Brahmanical literature began to look upon the Madra, Gandhara and Kamboja peoples as loose-lived and barbaric. As compared to the rigid four-class social system of Madhyadesa, these tribes of the frontiers followed two social classes and further there was permissible vertical mobility.... The women were treated equal to men and there was no taboo of social mixing among the two sexes. Both sexes ate meat, drank strong liquor and there would be mixed public dancing in a state of undress. Such way of life was positively obscene to the eastern Brahmin eyes. The custom of bride price among the Madras (instead of dowry) appeared degrading to the easterners. Nevertheless, the beauty, the loving nature and utter fidelity of the women of the north-west including Madra, Bahlika remained proverbial (e.g: Immortal Love Legend of Savitri & Satyavan. Savitri was the daughter of Asvapati, king of Madra tribe). A warrior's widow in these regions would even immolate herself with her husband's corpse. The horrifying custom of Sati was completely unknown in the east until as late as 6th century AD...." (See ref: Mobile Men: Limits to Social Change in Urban Punjab - 1976, p 3, Satish Saberwal; The Culture and Civilization of Ancient India in Historical Outline, p 119, D. D. Kosambi. Their literature is like that of Tukhara country but the customs, the common language, and rule of behavior are somewhat different. For clothing they use hair garments (wool); their garments are trimmed with furs. In commerce, they use gold and silver coins and also little copper coins. Hiuen Tsang further writes that the king of Kapisa is Kshatriya by caste. He is of shrewd character (nature) and being brave and determined, he has brought into subjection the neighboring countries, some ten of which he rules ".

According to scholars, much of the description of the people from Kapiśa to Rajapura as given by Hiuen Tsang agrees well with the characteristics of the Kambojas described in the Buddhist text, Bhuridatta Jataka as well in the great Indian epic  Mahabharata. Moreover, the Drona Parava of Mahabharata specifically attests that Rajapuram  was a metropolitan city of the epic Kambojas. The Rajapuram (=Rajapura) of Mahabharata (Ho-b-she-pu-lo of Hiuen Tsang) has been identified with modern Rajauri in south-western Kashmir. Culturally speaking, Kapiśa had significant Iranian influence.

The early Shahis of Kapiśa/Kabul
The affinities of the earlier shahi rulers (the so-called Turk Shahi) of Kapisa/Kabul, who are believed to have probably ruled from the early 5th century till 870 AD, are still not clear. All ancient sources unequivocally agree that the rulers of Kapisa were Kshatriyas from India and claimed descent from Ayodhya. Panini, writing in 5th century BCE, Chinese travellers visiting the kings many centuries later and even Kalhana writing five centuries after the Chinese travellers agree on their Kshatriya origins from India.

While their ethnicities were probably mixed, they practiced both Buddhism and Hinduism like the rest of India  The different scholars link their affinities to different ethnics. 11th-century Muslim histriographer Alberuni's confused accounts on the early history of Shahis based mainly as they are on folklore, do not inspire much confidence on the precise identity of the early Shahis of Kapisa/Kabul. They call them as Hindus on the one hand and claim their descent from the Turks, while at the same time, they also claim their origin/descent from Tibet.

Dr V. A. Smith calls the early Shahis as a Cadet Branch of the Kushanas without proof. H. M. Elliot identifies them with Kators/Katirs and further link them to Kushans. George Scott Robertson writes that the Kators/Katirs of Kafiristan belong to the Hindu Siyaposh tribal group of the Kams, Kamoz and Kamtoz tribes. Charles Fredrick Oldham identifies them with Naga-worshiping Takkas or Kathas and groups the Naga-cum-Sun worshipping Urasass (Hazaras), Abhisaras, Gandharas, Kambojas and Daradas collectively as the representatives of the Takkas or Kathas. Dr D. B. Pandey traces the affinities of the early Kabul Shahis to the Hunas. Bishan Singh and K. S. Dardi etc. connect the Kabul Shahis to the ancient Kshatriya clans of the Kambojas/Gandharas. 7th-century Chinese pilgrim Hiuen Tsang, who visited INdis (629 AD - 645 AD) calls the ruler of Kapisa as Buddhist and of a Kshatriya caste.

Kalhana, the 12th-century Kashmirian historian and author of the famous Rajatarangini, also calls the Shahis of Gandhara/Waihind as Kshatriyas. These early references from different sources link them as Kshatriya ruler and his dynasty undoubtedly to Hindu lineage. Further, though Kalhana takes the history of the Shahis to as early as or even earlier than 730 century AD, but he does not refer to any supplanting of the Shahi dynasty at any time in the entire history of the Shahis.

It is also worth mentioning here that the ancient Indian sources like Pāṇini's Astadhyayi, Harivamsa, Vayu Purana, Manusmriti, Mahabharata, Kautiliya's Arthashastra etc. etc. call the Kambojas and the Gandharas as Kshatriyas. According to Olaf Caroe, the earlier Kabul Shahis, in some sense, were the inheritors of the Kushana-Hephthalite chancery tradition and had brought in more Hinduised form with time. There does not yet exist in the upper Kabul valley any documentary evidence or any identifiable coinage which can establish the exact affinities of these early Shahis who ruled there during the first two Islamic centuries.

Obviously, the affinities of the early Shahis of Kapisa/Kabul are still speculative, and the inheritance of the Kushan-Hephthalite chancery tradition and political institutions by Kabul Shahis do not necessarily connect them to the preceding dynasty i.e. the Kushanas or Hephthalites. From the 5th century to about 794 AD, their capital was Kapisa, the ancient home of the cis-Hindukush Kambojas – popularly also known as Ashvakas. After the Arab Moslems began raiding the Shahi kingdom, the Shahi ruler of Kapisa moved their capital to Kabul (until 870 AD). Alberuni's accounts further claim that the last king of the early Shahiya dynasty was king Lagaturman (Katorman) who was overthrown and imprisoned by his Brahmin vizier called Kallar. Alberuni's reference to the Brahman vizier as having taken over the control of the Shahi dynasty, in fact, may be a reference to Kallar (and his successors) as having been followers of Brahmanical religion in contrast to Shahi Katorman (Lagaturman) or his predecessors Shahi rulers, who were undoubtedly staunch Buddhists. It is very likely that a change in religion may have been confused with change in dynasty. In any case, this started the line of so-called Hindu Shahi rulers, according to Alberuni's accounts.

Modern ethnics of Kapiśa
Scholars have identified the former Vedic Hindu clans of the Kams, Kamoje/Kamoz, Kamtoz etc. (or modern Nuristanis) as the relics of the Kapiśas i.e. Kambojas of the Paropamisan region. Similarly, the former Kafir-like Aspins of Chitral and Ashkuns or Yashkuns of Gilgit are identified as the modern representatives of the Pāṇinian Aśvakayanas (Greek: Assakenoi) and the Asip/Isap or Yusufzai (from Aspazai) in the Kabul valley (between river Kabul and Indus) are believed to be modern representatives of the Pāṇinian Aśvayanas (Greek: Aspasioi) respectively.

The Aśvakayanas and Aśvayanas are also believed to be sub-tribes of Paropamisan Kambojas, who were exclusively engaged in horse breeding/trading and also formed a specialised cavalry force.

See also
 Etymology of Kapisa
 Kapisa Province (modern Afghanistan)
Kapisa (city)

References

Kapisa
Kapisa
History of Kapisa Province